WVCT (91.5 FM) is a radio station  broadcasting a Southern gospel Christian radio format. Licensed to Keavy, Kentucky, United States.  The station is currently owned by Victory Training School Corp.

References

External links

Southern Gospel radio stations in the United States
VCT